The Jordan L. Mott House was a mansion located on 2122 Fifth Avenue, near 130th Street in the Harlem area of Manhattan, New York City.

History 
It was originally constructed by a member of the corrupt political ring of Boss Tweed "Slippery Dick" Richard B. Connolly. After Connolly had to flee the country, it was bought by the industrialist Jordan L. Mott and subsequently completed in 1880.

It was demolished in 1936.

Harlem
Fifth Avenue
Houses in Manhattan
Houses completed in 1880
Demolished buildings and structures in Manhattan
Buildings and structures demolished in 1936
1880 establishments in New York (state)
1936 disestablishments in New York (state)